Paulo Jorge dos Santos Gomes (born 3 November 1970 in Lisbon) is a Portuguese former professional footballer who played as a midfielder.

External links

Chamois FC79 profile 

1970 births
Living people
Footballers from Lisbon
Portuguese footballers
Association football midfielders
Ligue 2 players
Lille OSC players
FC Sochaux-Montbéliard players
Chamois Niortais F.C. players
Primeira Liga players
Vitória F.C. players
C.F. Os Belenenses players
Portuguese expatriate footballers
Wasquehal Football players